

Hellmuth Böhlke  (7 February 1893  – 8 April 1956) was a German general in the Wehrmacht of Nazi Germany during World War II who commanded the 334. Infanterie-Division.  He was also a recipient of the  Knight's Cross of the Iron Cross with Oak Leaves.

Awards and decorations
 Iron Cross (1914) 2nd Class  (12 October 1915) & 1st Class  (20 July 1916)
 Clasp to the Iron Cross (1939) 2nd Class (19 September 1939) & 1st Class  (9 November 1939)
 German Cross in Gold on 27 October 1941 as Oberst in Infanterie-Regiment 430
 Knight's Cross of the Iron Cross with Oak Leaves
 Knight's Cross on 24 September 1942 as Oberst and commander of Infanterie-Regiment 430
 716th Oak Leaves on 25 January 1945 as Generalleutnant and commander of 334. Infanterie-Division

References

Citations

Bibliography

 
 
 

1893 births
1956 deaths
People from Kościerzyna County
Lieutenant generals of the German Army (Wehrmacht)
German Army personnel of World War I
Recipients of the clasp to the Iron Cross, 1st class
Recipients of the Gold German Cross
Recipients of the Knight's Cross of the Iron Cross with Oak Leaves
German prisoners of war in World War II held by the United Kingdom
People from West Prussia
German Army generals of World War II